Richard N. "Rick" Goddard, a retired U.S. Air Force Major General, ran for the United States Congress in the 2008 election for Georgia's 8th congressional district as a Republican.
His last position in the Air Force before retiring was commander of Warner Robins Air Logistics Center, Robins Air Force Base, Georgia.

Early life, education and career 
Goddard graduated from the University of Utah in 1966 with a bachelor's degree in Political Science and received a Masters of Science in Business Administration from Central Michigan University in 1975. He entered the Air Force in 1966. He became a command pilot with more than 3,500 flying hours, including 226 combat missions in Southeast Asia flying the F-100 Super Sabre, and was awarded the Silver Star, Distinguished Flying Cross and twelve Air Medals.

Goddard commanded two aircraft maintenance squadrons and two FB-111 fighter/bomber squadrons, the 380th Bomb Wing at Plattsburgh Air Force Base in Plattsburgh, New York and the 27th Fighter Wing at Cannon Air Force Base near Clovis, New Mexico. As a member of the Joint Strategic Target Planning Staff, he served as deputy director of the National Strategic Target List and as deputy director for force employment plans. He also served as director of logistics at U.S. Air Forces in Europe and as director of logistics at Air Combat Command.  He retired from the Air Force on March 1, 2000.

Post-military career 
In 2003, Georgia Governor Sonny Perdue appointed Goddard to the Board of Directors of the Georgia Military Coordinating Committee, which is chartered to provide direct support to Georgia's military installations and military servicemembers in Georgia.

Since July 2006, Goddard has been the Vice President and Chief Technology Officer of Mercer University in Macon, Georgia; prior to that, he was the Senior Vice President for Administration.

U.S. Congressional campaigns

Goddard lost to Democratic incumbent Jim Marshall in 2008.

References

External links

Profile at SourceWatch

Year of birth missing (living people)
Living people
United States Air Force generals
University of Utah alumni
People from Macon, Georgia
Georgia (U.S. state) Republicans
Recipients of the Distinguished Flying Cross (United States)